Sandfordscourt (formerly "Cantwell's Court") is a townland in the civil parish of Rathcoole, in the barony of Gowran, County Kilkenny.https://www.logainm.ie/ga/27034 Placenames Database of Ireland. There is an association with the Crusades. It is home to Cantwell's Castle, a towerhouse.

Its former owner Thomas Sandford was Mayor of Kilkenny in 1723.

References

See also
 List of towns and villages in Ireland
 List of townlands in County Kilkenny

Townlands of County Kilkenny